Bruce Drake (December 5, 1905 – December 4, 1983) was a college men's basketball coach. The Gentry, Texas native was head coach at the University of Oklahoma between 1938 and 1955, compiling a 200–181 record. He also coached the Air Force team to a 34–14 record in 1956.

Prior to coaching, he was also a star for Hugh McDermott's Oklahoma team. He was a 1928–29 Helms Foundation All-American.

As a coach, Drake led the Sooners to two Final Fours–the first one in 1939, here they lost to Oregon 55–37; the second in 1947, where he lost in the Championship Game to Holy Cross 58–47. He made only one additional NCAA tournament appearance, in 1943. However, he coached at a time when only eight teams made the tournament. He won or shared six (Big Six/Big Seven conference titles. At the time of his retirement, he was the winningest coach in OU history, but is now third behind Billy Tubbs and Kelvin Sampson.

He coached 5 Olympic  (Wayne Glasgow and Marcus Freiberger of University of Oklahoma, 1952; Bill Evans, Ron Tomsic and Gib Ford of Air Force team, 1956) and three All-Americans (Jimmy McNatt, 1940; Gerald Tucker, 1943, 1947; Allie Paine, 1944)

Drake was selected as the assistant coach for the 1956 USA Men's Basketball Gold Medal Olympic Team

In 1958 he coached the Wichita Vickers in the National Industrial Basketball League getting 30–21 record tying him for first with his old player Gerald Tucker who was coaching the Bartlesville Phillips 66ers.

One of the lasting contributions Drake developed is the shuffle offense. He helped make goaltending illegal.

Drake was the Chairman of the NCAA Rules Committee from 1951–55. He made the Basketball Hall of Fame as a coach in 1973.

Head coaching record

See also
 List of NCAA Division I Men's Final Four appearances by coach

References

External links
 

1905 births
1983 deaths
All-American college men's basketball players
American men's basketball coaches
American men's basketball players
Basketball coaches from Texas
Basketball players from Texas
College men's basketball head coaches in the United States
Naismith Memorial Basketball Hall of Fame inductees
National Collegiate Basketball Hall of Fame inductees
Oklahoma Sooners men's basketball coaches
Oklahoma Sooners men's basketball players
People from Potter County, Texas
Phillips 66ers players